Crocinitomix algicola is a Gram-negative, strictly aerobic and rod-shaped bacterium from the genus of Crocinitomix which has been isolated from the algae Gracilaria blodgettii 
from Lingshui in China.

References

External links
Type strain of Crocinitomix algicola at BacDive -  the Bacterial Diversity Metadatabase

Flavobacteria
Bacteria described in 2017